Żywiec Basin is a lowland, located in southern Poland, between the Little Beskids to the north, Silesian Beskids to the west, Żywiec Beskids to the south and east, and Maków Beskids to the east. It is centered on the confluences of the rivers Koszarawa and Żylica with Soła close to the town of Żywiec, whence the name of the basin is derived from.

References 

Landforms of Poland